Hylaeaicum levianum is a species of flowering plant in the family Bromeliaceae, native to northern Brazil, Colombia and Venezuela. It was first described by Lyman Bradford Smith in 1968 as Neoregelia leviana.

References

Bromelioideae
Flora of Brazil
Flora of Colombia
Flora of Venezuela
Plants described in 1968